A rotor is an object in the geometric algebra (also called Clifford algebra) of a vector space that represents a rotation about the origin. The term originated with William Kingdon Clifford, in showing that the quaternion algebra is just a special case of Hermann Grassmann's "theory of extension" (Ausdehnungslehre).  Hestenes defined a rotor to be any element  of a geometric algebra that can be written as the product of an even number of unit vectors and satisfies , where  is the "reverse" of —that is, the product of the same vectors, but in reverse order.

Definition 
In mathematics, a rotor in the geometric algebra of a vector space V is the same thing as an element of the spin group Spin(V). We define this group below.

Let V be a vector space equipped with a positive definite quadratic form q, and let Cl(V) be the geometric algebra associated to V. The algebra Cl(V) is the quotient of the tensor algebra of V by the relations  for all . The Z-grading on the tensor algebra of V descends to a Z/2Z-grading on Cl(V), which we denote by  Here, Cleven(V) is generated by even-degree blades and Clodd(V) is generated by odd-degree blades.

On a blade (i.e., a simple tensor), it simply reverses the order of the factors. The spin group Spin(V) is defined to be the subgroup of Cleven(V) consisting of multivectors R such that  That is, it consists of multivectors that can be written as a product of an even number of unit vectors.

Action as rotation on the vector space

Reflections along a vector in geometric algebra may be represented as (minus) sandwiching a multivector M between a non-null vector v perpendicular to the hyperplane of reflection and that vector's inverse v−1:

and are of even grade.  Under a rotation generated by the rotor R, a general multivector M will transform double-sidedly as

This action gives a surjective homomorphism  presenting Spin(V) as a double cover of SO(V). (See Spin group for more details.)

Restricted alternative formulation
For a Euclidean space, it may be convenient to consider an alternative formulation, and some authors define the operation of reflection as (minus) the sandwiching of a unit (i.e. normalized) multivector:

forming rotors that are automatically normalised:

The derived rotor action is then expressed as a sandwich product with the reverse:

For a reflection for which the associated vector squares to a negative scalar, as may be the case with a pseudo-Euclidean space, such a vector can only be normalized up to the sign of its square, and additional bookkeeping of the sign of the application the rotor becomes necessary. The formulation in terms of the sandwich product with the inverse as above suffers no such shortcoming.

Rotations of multivectors and spinors

However, though as multivectors also transform double-sidedly, rotors can be combined and form a group, and so multiple rotors compose single-sidedly. The alternative formulation above is not self-normalizing and motivates the definition of spinor in geometric algebra as an object that transforms single-sidedly – i.e., spinors may be regarded as non-normalised rotors in which the reverse rather than the inverse is used in the sandwich product.

Homogeneous representation algebras

In homogeneous representation algebras such as conformal geometric algebra, a rotor in the representation space corresponds to a rotation about an arbitrary point, a translation or possibly another transformation in the base space.

See also

Double rotation
Lie group
Euler's formula
Generator (mathematics)
Versor

References

Geometric algebra